The 2024 Anchorage mayoral election will be held on April 2, 2024, to elect the mayor of Anchorage, Alaska. Incumbent Republican mayor Dave Bronson is running for re-election to a second term in office.

Candidates

Declared
Dave Bronson, incumbent mayor (Party affiliation: Republican)

Potential
Suzanne LaFrance, Anchorage Assemblywoman

References

Anchorage
Anchorage
Mayoral elections in Anchorage, Alaska